Donald Ray Reeves (July 31, 1911 – January 3, 1973), nicknamed "Soup", was an American baseball right fielder in the Negro leagues. He played from 1937 to 1941 with the Atlanta Black Crackers, Indianapolis ABCs, and the Chicago American Giants. He was a graduate of Clark Atlanta University, then known as Clark College, where he played baseball, basketball, and football. He was selected to the 1940 East-West Game. After his baseball career, he became a teacher in Atlanta, Georgia.

References

External links
 and Baseball-Reference Black Baseball stats and Seamheads

Clark University alumni
Atlanta Black Crackers players
Indianapolis ABCs players
Chicago American Giants players
Burials at South-View Cemetery
Baseball outfielders